Picking or Pickings may refer to:

Activities
 Fruit picking
 Guitar picking, various techniques for playing a guitar
 Lock picking, the art of unlocking a lock without the original key
 Nose-picking, the act of extracting mucus and/or foreign bodies from the nose
 Skin picking, or Dermatillomania
 Continental knitting, a style of knitting also known as picking
 In computer graphics, the task of determining which screen-rendered object a user has clicked on
 Order picking, in logistics the task of selecting an item for shipment

People
 Jake Picking (born 1991), American actor
 Jonti Picking (born 1975), British web personality and flash animator
 Sherwood Picking (1890–1941), United States Navy officer

Other uses
 Pickings, another word for plunder
 Pickings (film), a 2018 neo-noir film